Madge Bester (26 April 1963 – 19 March 2018) was a former world's shortest living woman. From South Africa, in 1991 she measured 65 cm (2 ft 1.5 inches) in height. Bester had osteogenesis imperfecta, which is characterized by brittle bones, and used a wheelchair.

She was a campaigner for disability rights, holding a 1998 press conference on the issue accompanied by Lin Yih-Chih, the world's smallest man.

Bester lived in a retirement village in Bloemfontein. Her mother Winnie, who died in 2001, also had osteogenesis imperfecta and measured only 70 cm.

Bester died on 19 March 2018, aged 54.

See also
 List of the verified shortest people

References

1963 births
2018 deaths
Afrikaner people
People with osteogenesis imperfecta
People from Bloemfontein
South African disability rights activists
Place of death missing
South African people with disabilities